Rawmarsh Welfare F.C. was an English football club located in Rawmarsh, Rotherham, South Yorkshire.

History
The club was formed in 1910 as Horse & Jockey, and initially played in the Rotherham Licensed Victuallers League before moving on to the Sheffield Association League and renaming themselves as Rawmarsh Town.

After the First World War finished, the club was again renamed, this time to Rawmarsh Athletic, but this name too would not last long as Rawmarsh Welfare was soon settled upon, and the club started to gain success on the pitch. They won the Association League for the first time in 1936, and three years later they secured a league and cup double by winning their second league title and the prestigious Sheffield & Hallamshire Senior Cup – beating Worksop Town in the final.

A third Association League title was won soon after the Second World War in 1951, and a year later they reached the 1st Round of the FA Cup for the first and only time – losing 1–4 to Buxton at their Dale Road home.

In 1953 Rawmarsh joined the Yorkshire League, and won the Division 2 title at the first attempt. They stayed in the Yorkshire League for nearly 30 years and built up a reputation as a yo-yo club – continually being promoted and relegated between Divisions 1 and 2 during the 1950s, and between Divisions 2 and 3 in the 1970s and 1980s. They won the Division Two title a record four times, and won the Yorkshire League title for the only time in 1970.

In 1982 the club disbanded after finishing near the foot of Division 3 for the first time – having previously won promotion from the division on three occasions only to be relegated straight back again.

Notable former players
Players that played in the Football League either before or after being with Rawmarsh Welfare –

 Gordon Banks
 Wally Gould
 Jack Haigh
 Harold Mosby

League and cup history

* League play-off finalists

Honours

League
Yorkshire League Division One
Champions: 1969–70Yorkshire League Division Two
Promoted: 1953–54 (champions), 1955–56 (champions), 1958–59, 1963–64 (champions), 1968–69 (champions)
Yorkshire League Division Three
Promoted: 1975–76 (champions), 1977–78, 1979–80Sheffield Association LeagueChampions: 1935–36, 1938–39, 1950–51Hatchard LeagueRunners-up: 1901–02

CupSheffield & Hallamshire Senior Cup'''
Winners: 1938–39, 1970–71
Runners-up: 1932–33

Records
Best League performance: 1st, Yorkshire League Division 1, 1969–70
Best FA Cup performance: 1st Round, 1951–52
Best FA Amateur Cup performance: 3rd Round, 1930–31, 1933–34
Best FA Vase performance: 1st Round, 1975–76, 1977–78, 1978–79

References

Defunct football clubs in England
Defunct football clubs in South Yorkshire
1982 disestablishments in England
Association football clubs disestablished in 1982
Hatchard League
Sheffield Association League
Yorkshire Football League
Sheffield Amateur League